The Action for Rescuing Indonesia Coalition (Indonesian: Koalisi Aksi Menyelamatkan Indonesia, KAMI) is an Indonesian political pressure group founded on 18 August 2020 in Taman Proklamasi, Jakarta. Claimed itself as "moral movement", it was founded by Ahmad Yani, Rocky Gerung, Din Syamsuddin, Gatot Nurmantyo, Rochmad Wahab, Meutia Farida Hatta, Malam Sambat Kaban, Said Didu, Refly Harun, Ichsanuddin Noorsy, Lieus Sungkharisma, Jumhur Hidayat, Abdullah Hehamahua, and Amien Rais. It is described as a right-wing, populist, traditionalist conservatist, elitist, extra-parliamentary, non-partisan pressure group, due to being founded by right-wing politicians and former generals formerly supporting Prabowo Subianto during 2019 Presidential Election although most of the figures are politically independent from Indonesian political parties at that time, but shared similar political ideologies, and being elitist as founded and motorized by older generation of traditionalist-minded former government officials, ministers, politicians, and public figures. It was also powered by Islamic Defenders Front (Indonesian: Front Pembela Islam, FPI) activists, indicating the alignment of this group with Islamic fundamentalism.

The group was born as result of nearly un-inhibited power gained by Joko Widodo in his second term of presidency and weak opposition in People's Representative Council as result of success of Joko Widodo in winning the election, defending his presidency, and successfully pulling large parties formerly opposed him.

KAMI do not have intention to be a political party. Although not become a political party, it motorized opposition against Joko Widodo and criticized his policies since its formation. However, acted in contradicton against their previous statements, elements of the coalition entered and unilaterally hijacked the Masyumi Party revival preparatory process that already in midway did by Investigating Committee for Foundation of Islamic Ideological Parties/Preparatory Committee for Foundation of Islamic Ideological Parties (Indonesian: Badan Penyelidik Usaha-Usaha Persiapan Pendirian Partai Islam Ideologis/Panitia Persiapan Pendirian Partai Islam Ideologis, BPU-PPPII/P4II) group. This lead into broke down of the preparatory group and led into formation of Masyumi Reborn Party. A number of faithful members of the preparatory group later founded the Indonesian People's Da'wah Party. Either unknown to the them and Masyumi Reborn Party or not, the preparatory group actually are Jemaah Islamiyah members in disguise, and on 16 November 2021, Indonesian People's Da'wah Party suffered crackdown and become the center of the scandal.

Since the group came from various political background and ideologies but with same goal to topple Joko Widodo from presidency, the group much likely an "Anti-Joko Widodo movement".

Controversies 
KAMI continuously spreading pessimism and exercising populist narrative campaign against the ruling government, a strategy similarly used by Prabowo Subianto during his election campaign. The strategy now already abandoned even by Prabowo, but KAMI still used it. The use of negativity campaign even used to the extent spreading negativity and skepticism against policies taken by the government in combating COVID-19 pandemic in Indonesia. As the result, KAMI rejected in many places in Indonesia due to inciting distrust against the government and disturbing local and regional stability and order. 

The group was accused to piggybacking Indonesia omnibus law protests by an unknown pro-government group installed anti-KAMI banner in Jakarta on 12 October 2020. The group still unidentified until this day. On 13 October 2020, KAMI central committee members Syahnanda Nainggolan, Anton Permana, and Jumhur Hidayat captured by Police after getting caught spreading hoax materials related to Omnibus Law on Job Creation to fuel the protest.

KAMI advocated (or pushed) People's Consultative Assembly to hold special session to fire Joko Widodo from presidency without logical reason or reasons outlined by the constitution, only based on his "un-successful-ness" in running the country and his program. As the result, members of People's Consultative Assembly and political experts denounced KAMI and accused KAMI to attempt inciting de-legitimation, sedition, disintegration, and distrust.

KAMI was supported Islamic Defenders Front (Indonesian: Front Pembela Islam, FPI) and their Islamism ideologies, despite having non-Muslims in KAMI rank and FPI notorious hatred against non-Muslims. On 5 December 2020, the group supported Revolusi Akhlak (Indonesian: Moral Revolution) program of FPI in attempt to topple down current ruling government deemed "immoral" and worth to be topple down to "save Indonesia". The expression of support was announced by KAMI before FPI finally dissolved 30 December 2020. 

KAMI also launched slanderous allegation to the Indonesian National Armed Forces. They claimed that communism is already returned in Indonesia and "communist agents" now sitting in the armed forces erasing legacies and memorials of Soeharto and cleansing of Indonesian communists in 1965-1966, claiming that "communists" attempted to revise the history. As the proof, Gatot Nurmantyo, member of KAMI central committee, claimed that Soeharto, and other generals memorial statues are demolished from Kostrad HQ. In fact, the statues was retracted by the sculptor, Lieutenant General A.Y. Nasution due to personal religious reason on 30 August 2021. Another fact, in many areas in Indonesia, Soeharto statues actually still intact. As the result of the slanderous allegation launching, People's Representative Council requested Gatot to take responsibility of his statements and asked him to present his proofs of communists return in Indonesia. Academicians and historians also urged Gatot to deliver his proofs to Indonesian National Armed Forces, National Police, Ministry of Defense, and Coordinating Ministry for Political, Legal, and Security Affairs for clarification, given Gatot is a former Commander of the Indonesian National Armed Forces which made him an honorable person.

Opposition 
A pro-government extra-parliamentary mass organization Unanimous Homeland Unity for Indonesia our Homeland (Indonesian: Kebijakan Kerapatan Indonesia Tanah Air, KITA) launched on 9 September 2020 in Bandung by Maman Imanulhaq, a modernist pluralist kyai from West Java, Nahdlatul Ulama activist, and politically affiliated with National Awakening Party. The movement is a counter-movement against KAMI negativism and pessimism.

References 

2020 establishments in Indonesia
Right-wing politics in Asia
Right-wing politics in Indonesia